Trisetaria is a genus of plants in the grass family, native to Asia and to the Mediterranean region.

 Species

 formerly included

References

Pooideae
Poaceae genera
Taxa named by Peter Forsskål